Henry Cross may refer to:

Henry Cross (screenwriter), of Night Train to Paris
Henry Cross (cricketer), see List of Wellington representative cricketers

See also
Harry Cross (disambiguation)